The Long Goodbye Tour was a concert tour by British hard rock band Deep Purple in support for their 20th studio album, Infinite.

Background
Drummer Ian Paice suffered a minor stroke in June 2016, which affected his right hand, knuckles, thumbs and fingers. This led to some Deep Purple concerts in Scandinavia being cancelled, and were the first of the band's shows he had been forced to cancel since Deep Purple's formation in 1968.

At the time of the Long Goodbye Tour's announcement in December 2016, Paice told the Heavyworlds website it "may be the last big tour", adding that the band "don't know". He described the tour as being long in duration, and said: "We haven't made any hard, fast plans, but it becomes obvious that you cannot tour the same way you did when you were 21. It becomes more and more difficult. People have other things in their lives, which take time. But never say never."

Deep Purple's studio album, Infinite, was released on 7 April 2017 and the Long Goodbye Tour serves as support for the record.

Opening acts
Europe (United Kingdom dates, 2017)
Cats In Space (United Kingdom dates, 2017)
Cheap Trick and Tesla (South America 2017)
Alice Cooper (North America 2017)
The Edgar Winter Band (North America 2017)
Monster Truck (Europe 2017)
Divlje jagode ft. Tony Martin and Andy LaRocque (Europe, 2017, Zagreb only)
Tiebreaker (Europe 2017, Oslo only)
Judas Priest (Co-headliner, North America 2018)
In Flames (Mexico 2018)
Joyous Wolf (United States 2019)

Setlists
{{hidden
| headercss = background: #ccccff; font-size: 100%; width: 55%;
| contentcss = text-align: left; font-size: 100%; width: 55%;
| header = Europe I
| content = 
 "Time For Bedlam" (From Infinite)
 "Fireball" (From Fireball)
 "Bloodsucker" (From Deep Purple In Rock)
 "Strange Kind Of Woman" (From Fireball)
 "Johnny's Band" (From Infinite) (not on the Hellfest gig)
 "Uncommon Man" (From Now What?!)
 "The Surprising" (From Infinite)
 "Lazy" (From Machine Head)
 "Birds Of Prey" (From Infinite)
 "Hell To Pay" (From Now What?!)
 Don Airey Keyboard Solo
 "Perfect Strangers" (From Perfect Strangers)
 "Space Truckin'" (From Machine Head)
 "Smoke On The Water" (From Machine Head)
Encore:
 "Highway Star" (From Machine Head) (not on every show)
 "Hush" (From Shades of Deep Purple)
 Roger Glover Bass Solo (not on the Hellfest gig)
 "Black Night" (From Deep Purple In Rock)
}}

{{hidden
| headercss = background: #ccccff; font-size: 100%; width: 55%;
| contentcss = text-align: left; font-size: 100%; width: 55%;
| header = North America
| content = 
 "Highway Star" (From Machine Head)
 "Fireball" (From Fireball)
 "Strange Kind Of Woman" (From Fireball)
 "Uncommon Man" (From Now What?!)
 "Lazy" (From Machine Head)
 "Knocking At Your Back Door" (From Perfect Strangers) (not on every show)
 "The Surprising" (From Infinite) or "Pictures of Home" (From Machine Head)
 Don Airey Keyboard Solo
 "Perfect Strangers" (From Perfect Strangers)
 "Space Truckin'" (From Machine Head)
 "Smoke On The Water" (From Machine Head) (sometimes played after "Hush")
Encore:
 "Time for Bedlam" (From Infinite)
 "Hush" (From Shades of Deep Purple)
}}

{{hidden
| headercss = background: #ccccff; font-size: 100%; width: 55%;
| contentcss = text-align: left; font-size: 100%; width: 55%;
| header = Europe II
| content = 
 "Time For Bedlam" (From Infinite)
 "Fireball" (From Fireball)
 "Bloodsucker" (From Deep Purple In Rock)
 "Strange Kind Of Woman" (From Fireball) (not on the British shows)
 "All I Got Is You" (From Infinite)
 "Uncommon Man" (From Now What?!)
 "The Surprising" (From Infinite)
 "Lazy" (From Machine Head)
 "Birds Of Prey" (From Infinite)
 "Knocking At Your Back Door" (From Perfect Strangers)
 Don Airey Keyboard Solo
 "Perfect Strangers" (From Perfect Strangers)
 "Space Truckin'" (From Machine Head)
 "Smoke On The Water" (From Machine Head) (with Europe's John Norum on the London show)
Encore:
 "Hush" (From Shades of Deep Purple)
 Roger Glover Bass Solo
 "Black Night" (From Deep Purple In Rock)
}}

{{hidden
| headercss = background: #ccccff; font-size: 100%; width: 55%;
| contentcss = text-align: left; font-size: 100%; width: 55%;
| header = South America
| content = 
 "Highway Star" (From Machine Head)
 "Pictures of Home" (From Machine Head)
 "Bloodsucker" (From Deep Purple In Rock)
 "Strange Kind of Woman" (From Fireball)
 "Uncommon Man" (From Now What?!)
 "Lazy" (From Machine Head)
 "Birds Of Prey" (From Infinite)
 "Knocking at Your Back Door" (From Perfect Strangers)
 Don Airey Keyboard Solo
 "Perfect Strangers" (From Perfect Strangers)
 "Space Truckin'" (From Machine Head)
 "Smoke On The Water" (From Machine Head)
Encore:
 "Green Onions" (Booker T. & the M.G.'s cover, only at Hell and Heaven Metal Fest)
 "Hush" (From Shades of Deep Purple)
 Roger Glover Bass Solo
 "Black Night" (From Deep Purple In Rock)
}}

{{hidden
| headercss = background: #ccccff; font-size: 100%; width: 55%;
| contentcss = text-align: left; font-size: 100%; width: 55%;
| header = Europe III
| content = 
 "Highway Star" (From Machine Head)
 "Pictures of Home" (From Machine Head) (played after "Bloodsucker" in Moscow)
 "Bloodsucker" (From Deep Purple In Rock)
 "Strange Kind of Woman" (From Fireball)
 "Sometimes I Feel Like Screaming" (From Purpendicular)
 "Uncommon Man" (From Now What?!)
 "Lazy" (From Machine Head)
 "Time For Bedlam" (From Infinite)
 "Birds Of Prey" (From Infinite)
 "Knocking at Your Back Door" (From Perfect Strangers) or "The Surprising" (From Infinite)
 Don Airey Keyboard Solo
 "Perfect Strangers" (From Perfect Strangers)
 "Space Truckin'" (From Machine Head)
 "Smoke On The Water" (From Machine Head)
Encore:
 "Hush" (From Shades of Deep Purple)
 Roger Glover Bass Solo
 "Black Night" (From Deep Purple In Rock)
}}

{{hidden
| headercss = background: #ccccff; font-size: 100%; width: 55%;
| contentcss = text-align: left; font-size: 100%; width: 55%;
| header = North America II
| content = 
 "Highway Star" (From Machine Head)
 "Pictures of Home" (From Machine Head)
 "Bloodsucker" (From Deep Purple In Rock)
 "Strange Kind of Woman" (From Fireball)
 "Sometimes I Feel Like Screaming" (From Purpendicular)
 "Uncommon Man" (From Now What?!)
 "Lazy" (From Machine Head)
 "Knocking at Your Back Door" (From Perfect Strangers)
 Don Airey Keyboard Solo
 "Perfect Strangers" (From Perfect Strangers)
 "Space Truckin'" (From Machine Head)
 "Smoke On The Water" (From Machine Head)
Encore:
 "Hush" (From Shades of Deep Purple)
}}

{{hidden
| headercss = background: #ccccff; font-size: 100%; width: 55%;
| contentcss = text-align: left; font-size: 100%; width: 55%;
| header = Japan
| content = 
 "Highway Star" (From Machine Head)
 "Pictures of Home" (From Machine Head)
 "Bloodsucker" (From Deep Purple In Rock)
 "Strange Kind of Woman" (From Fireball)
 "Sometimes I Feel Like Screaming" (From Purpendicular)
 "Uncommon Man" (From Now What?!)
 "Lazy" (From Machine Head)
 "The Surprising" (From Infinite)
 "Time For Bedlam" (From Infinite)
 "Birds Of Prey" (From Infinite)
 Don Airey Keyboard Solo
 "Perfect Strangers" (From Perfect Strangers)
 "Space Truckin'" (From Machine Head)
 "Smoke On The Water" (From Machine Head)
Encore:
 "Hush" (From Shades of Deep Purple)
 "Black Night" (From Deep Purple In Rock)
}}

{{hidden
| headercss = background: #ccccff; font-size: 100%; width: 55%;
| contentcss = text-align: left; font-size: 100%; width: 55%;
| header = Mexico
| content = 
 "Highway Star" (From Machine Head)
 "Pictures of Home" (From Machine Head)
 "Bloodsucker" (From Deep Purple In Rock)
 "Demon's Eye" or "Strange Kind of Woman" (From Fireball)
 "Sometimes I Feel Like Screaming" (From Purpendicular)
 "Uncommon Man" (From Now What?!)
 "Lazy" (From Machine Head)
 "The Surprising" (From Infinite)
 "Time For Bedlam" (From Infinite)
 "Birds Of Prey" (From Infinite)
 Don Airey Keyboard Solo
 "Perfect Strangers" (From Perfect Strangers)
 "Space Truckin'" (From Machine Head)
 "Smoke On The Water" (From Machine Head)
Encore:
 "Hush" (From Shades of Deep Purple)
 "Black Night" (From Deep Purple In Rock)
}}

{{hidden
| headercss = background: #ccccff; font-size: 100%; width: 55%;
| contentcss = text-align: left; font-size: 100%; width: 55%;
| header = United States
| content =# "Highway Star" (From Machine Head)
 "Pictures of Home" (From Machine Head)
 "Bloodsucker" (From Deep Purple In Rock)
 "Demon's Eye" (From Fireball)
 "Sometimes I Feel Like Screaming" (From Purpendicular)
 "Uncommon Man" (From Now What?!)
 "Lazy" (From Machine Head)
 "Time For Bedlam" (From Infinite)
 Don Airey Keyboard Solo
 "Perfect Strangers" (From Perfect Strangers)
 "Space Truckin'" (From Machine Head)
 "Smoke On The Water" (From Machine Head)
Encore:
 "Hush" (From Shades of Deep Purple)
 "Black Night" (From Deep Purple In Rock) 
}}

{{hidden
| headercss = background: #ccccff; font-size: 100%; width: 55%;
| contentcss = text-align: left; font-size: 100%; width: 55%;
| header = Europe IV
| content =# "Highway Star" (From Machine Head)
 "Pictures of Home" (From Machine Head)
 "Bloodsucker" (From Deep Purple In Rock)
 "Demon's Eye" (From Fireball)
 "Sometimes I Feel Like Screaming" (From Purpendicular)
 "Uncommon Man" (From Now What?!)
 "Lazy" (From Machine Head)
 "Time For Bedlam" (From Infinite)
 Don Airey Keyboard Solo
 "Perfect Strangers" (From Perfect Strangers)
 "Space Truckin'" (From Machine Head)
 "Smoke On The Water" (From Machine Head)
Encore:
 "Hush" (From Shades of Deep Purple)
 "Black Night" (From Deep Purple In Rock) 
}}

Tour dates

Personnel
Ian Gillan – vocals
Steve Morse – guitars
Roger Glover – bass
Ian Paice – drums
Don Airey – keyboards

Notes

References

2017 concert tours
2018 concert tours
2019 concert tours
Deep Purple concert tours